Habiba Sadou (born 1 November 1986) is an Algerian international footballer who plays as a defender for the Algeria women's national football team. She competed for Algeria at the 2018 Africa Women Cup of Nations, playing in two matches.

References

External links
 

1986 births
Living people
Algerian women's footballers
Women's association football defenders
Algeria women's international footballers
21st-century Algerian people